Kirchspielslandgemeinde Albersdorf was an Amt ("collective municipality") in the district of Dithmarschen, in Schleswig-Holstein, Germany. On 25 May 2008, it merged with the Amt Kirchspielslandgemeinde Meldorf-Land and the town Meldorf to form the Amt Mitteldithmarschen. Its seat was in Albersdorf.

The Amt Kirchspielslandgemeinde Albersdorf consisted of the following municipalities (with population in 2005):

 Albersdorf (3,588)
 Arkebek (250)
 Bunsoh (871)
 Immenstedt (97)
 Offenbüttel (283)
 Osterrade (462)
 Schafstedt (1,343)
 Schrum (77)
 Tensbüttel-Röst (692)
 Wennbüttel (77)

Former Ämter in Schleswig-Holstein